Cheshmeh Chelvar (also Romanized as Cheshmeh Chelvār; also known as Chelvār and Cholbār) is a village in Qaleh-ye Khvajeh Rural District, in the Central District of Andika County, Khuzestan Province, Iran. At the 2006 census, its population was 341, in 52 families.

References 

Populated places in Andika County